K. Eduard Häberlin (8 March 1820 – 14 February 1884) was a Swiss politician and President of the Swiss Council of States (1863).

His brother Friedrich Heinrich Häberlin (1834-1897) eventually became President of the Swiss National Council (1889/1890). Heinrich Häberlin (1868–1947) was his nephew.

External links 
 
 

Members of the Council of States (Switzerland)
Presidents of the Council of States (Switzerland)
Federal Supreme Court of Switzerland judges
1820 births
1884 deaths
19th-century Swiss judges
19th-century Swiss politicians